Nongmeikapam Kotiswar Singh (born 1 March 1963) is an Indian Judge. Presently, he is Chief Justice of Jammu & Kashmir and Ladakh High Court. He is former Judge of Gauhati High Court and Manipur High Court. He has also served as the Acting Chief Justice of Gauhati High Court for three times and Acting Chief Justice of Manipur High Court for two times.

Career
Singh was born in 1963 in Imphal. His father N. Ibotombi Singh was a former Judge of the Gauhati High Court and first Advocate General of the State of Manipur. Singh completed his schooling from Ramakrishna Mission Vidyapith, Purulia and graduated from Kirori Mal College in 1983. He passed LL.B. from the Delhi University in 1986. He practiced in the Supreme Court, the Gauhati High Court and in the Central Administrative Tribunal. On 3 November 2007 he was appointed Advocate General of Manipur. He was elevated as an Additional Judge of Gauhati High Court on 17 October 2011 and made permanent judge on 7 November 2012. He was appointed as Judge of Manipur High Court upon its creation on 23 March 2013. He was appointed as Acting Chief Justice of Manipur High Court from 1 July 2017 to 8 February 2018 and again from 23 February 2018 to 17 May 2018. He was transferred as Judge of Gauhati High Court on 11 October 2018. He was appointed as Acting Chief Justice of Gauhati High Court from 21 September 2020 to 9 January 2021, from 9 May 2022 to 22 June 2022 and again from 12 January 2022 to 14 February 2022. He was appointed as Chief Justice of Jammu & Kashmir and Ladakh High Court on 15 February 2023.

References

External links 
 List of Judges of Gauhati High Court

Indian judges
1963 births
Living people
Judges of the Gauhati High Court
Judges of the Manipur High Court
Delhi University alumni
People from Imphal